Churrigueresque (Spanish: Churrigueresco), also but less commonly "Ultra Baroque", refers to a Spanish Baroque style of elaborate sculptural architectural ornament which emerged as a manner of stucco decoration in Spain in the late 17th century and was used up to about 1750, marked by extreme, expressive and florid decorative detailing, normally found above the entrance on the main facade of a building.

Origins
Named after the architect and sculptor, José Benito de Churriguera (1665–1725), who was born in Madrid and who worked primarily in Madrid and Salamanca, the origins of the style are said to go back to an architect and sculptor named Alonso Cano, who designed the facade of the cathedral at Granada, in 1667.

A distant, early 15th century precursor of the highly elaborate Churrigueresque style can be found in the Lombard Charterhouse of Pavia, yet the sculpture-encrusted facade still has the Italianate appeal to rational narrative. Churrigueresque appeals to the proliferative geometry and it is an intense evolution of Baroque, influenced by the same Baroque.

Development
The development of the style passed through three phases. Between 1680 and 1720, the Churriguera popularized Guarino Guarini's blend of Solomonic columns and composite order, known as "supreme order". Between 1720 and 1760, the Churrigueresque column, or estipite, in the shape of an inverted cone or obelisk, was established as a central element of ornamental decoration. The years from 1760 to 1780 saw a gradual shift of interest away from twisted movement and excessive ornamentation towards neoclassical balance and sobriety. 

Among the highlights of the style, interiors of the Granada Charterhouse offer some of the most impressive combinations of space and light in 18th-century Europe. Integrating sculpture and architecture even more radically, Narciso Tomé achieved striking chiaroscuro effects in his Transparente for the Toledo Cathedral. Perhaps the most visually intoxicating form of the style was Mexican Churrigueresque, practiced in the mid-18th century by Lorenzo Rodriguez, whose masterpiece is the Sagrario Metropolitano (1749–69) in Mexico City, New Spain.

Spain
The first of the Churriguera was José Benito de Churriguera (1665–1725), who trained as a joiner of altarpieces, drawing some very important for various churches of Salamanca, Madrid, Valladolid and other cities in Spain. Some in Spain have gone and some remain only a sites:
Nuevo Baztán, Community of Madrid
Church of St Francisco Javier and Goyeneche Palace
Salamanca, Castile and León 
Altarpiece of Convent of San Esteban
Choir of the New Cathedral.
Plaza Mayor.
Capilla de la Vera Cruz
College of Calatrava
Seville
Palace of San Telmo

Mexico

In Mexico, the Cathedral Basilica of Zacatecas, capital of Zacatecas state, and the Templo de Santa Prisca, located in Taxco, Guerrero state are considered as masterpieces of Churrigueresque style. The building of Parroquia Antigua in Salamanca, Guanajuato, founded on August 24, 1603, was completed in the year 1690, and the Churrigueresque facade in 1740. The altarpiece of the church of San Francisco Javier (National Museum of Viceroyalty) in Tepotzotlán, State of Mexico is also considered, along with its facade, one of the most important baroque churrigueresque works created by the Jesuits in New Spain. The Altar de los Reyes of the Mexico City Metropolitan Cathedral and the facades of the Sagrario Metropolitano, by the Spanish architect Lorenzo Rodriguez, which is attached to the same Cathedral, are also representatives of the style.

California Churrigueresque

California Churrigueresque is a revival style native to California, developed in the early 20th century by architects Bertram Goodhue and Carleton Winslow Sr. for the 1915 Panama-California Exposition, which helped popularize its use in Spanish Colonial Revival architecture in California, and to a lesser extent the rest of the United States. Goodhue and Winslow developed the style after studying Churrigueresque and Plateresque ornamentation in Spanish Colonial buildings in Mexico. 

Many of the best examples of California Churrigeresque are located in Balboa Park in San Diego, the site of the Panama-California Exposition. Other notable buildings in this style include San Francisco's Mission Dolores Basilica, the First Congregational Church of Riverside, Los Angeles's St. Vincent de Paul Church and Beverly Hills City Hall. The Golden Gate Theater in East Los Angeles is another example.

See also
New Spanish Baroque
 Baroque
 Architecture of the Spanish Renaissance
 Spanish Colonial architecture
 Rococo
 Spanish architecture
 Mexican architecture

References

Bibliography
 Pevsner, Fleming and Honour, The Penguin Dictionary of Architecture, Penguin Books, Middlesex, England, 1983
 Kelemen, Pal, Baroque and Rococo in Latin America, Dover Publications Inc., New York,  volumes I and II, 1967

External links

 
 Churrigueresque
Churrigueresque
 Churrigueresque
Architectural history